The 2003 Woking Council election took place on 1 May 2003 to elect members of Woking Borough Council in Surrey, England. One third of the council was up for election and the council stayed under no overall control.

After the election, the composition of the council was:
Conservative 17
Liberal Democrat 12
Labour 6
Independent 1

Background
The election saw 13 seats being contested with the contest in Brookwood ward being a by-election after the previous Conservative councillor, Mark Pritchard, resigned his seat on the council. Three long standing councillors also stood down at the election, Alf Stranks in Byfleet ward, Gordon Brown in Horsell East and Woodham and Rosemary Johnson in Old Woking. As well as candidates from the Conservatives, Liberal Democrats and Labour, there were also 3 from the United Kingdom Independence Party, 2 independents and 1 from the Green Party.

Election result
No party won a majority in the election with the council remaining under no overall control as it had been since the 1998 election. The only party to have more seats after the election than before was Labour after they gained Old Woking from the Liberal Democrats by 26 votes. Meanwhile, the Conservatives and Liberal Democrats each gained one seat from the other, with the Conservatives taking Byfleet by 27 votes and the Liberal Democrats winning Brookwood by 7 votes. Overall turnout in the election was 33.66%.

The failure by the Conservatives to gain the two seats they needed to have a majority on the council was described as disappointing by commentators, in a year when the party gained seats nationally.

Ward results

References

2003
2003 English local elections
2000s in Surrey